Santo Antônio Grande River is a river of Alagoas state in eastern Brazil. It is a tributary of the Jacuipe River.

See also
List of rivers of Alagoas

References
Brazilian Ministry of Transport

Rivers of Alagoas